Henry A. Oberbeck  (May 17, 1858 – August 26, 1921) was a 19th-century professional baseball outfielder, third baseman, pitcher and umpire.

Oberbeck collected 42 hits in 238 at bats for a .176 career batting average. He also pitched in eight games in his two-year Major League career, finishing with a 0–5 win–loss record.

For three games in 1884, Oberbeck was used as an umpire for the Union Association.

References

External links

Major League Baseball outfielders
Major League Baseball third basemen
St. Louis Browns (AA) players
Pittsburgh Alleghenys players
Baltimore Monumentals players
19th-century baseball players
Baseball players from St. Louis
1858 births
1921 deaths
Peoria Reds players
Kansas City Cowboys (UA) players
Major League Baseball umpires
19th-century baseball umpires